Overlord and the Underwoods is a Canadian television family sitcom co-created by Anthony Q. Farrell and Ryan Wiesbrock, and is a co-production between MarbleMedia and Cloudco Entertainment.

The series first premiered in the United Kingdom on October 4, 2021 on Nickelodeon, while it premiered in Canada on October 29, 2021 on CBC Gem. In the US the first 10 episodes were made available on November 8, 2021 on the BYUtv app.

Premise
The series focuses on a North American family called the Underwoods, whose life is flipped upside down when the second most wanted criminal in the world, their distant cousin Overlord - who is an alien, seeks refuge in their home after being forced into intergalactic witness protection after he snitches on his boss and is made to live with the Underwoods.

Cast
 Darryl Hinds as Jim Underwood
 Patrice Goodman as Flower Underwood
 Ari Resnick as Weaver Underwood
 Kamaia Fairburn as Willow Underwood
 Troy Feldman as Overlord
 Jann Arden as the voice of R0-FL, Overlord's robot sidekick
 Jayne Eastwood as the Underwoods' neighbour

Episodes

Development and broadcast
The series was announced on March 16, 2021, and was pre-sold by Nickelodeon International, BYUtv in the United States, CBC in Canada and ITV in the United Kingdom on the same day.

Production on the series began in June 2021 in Oakville, Ontario.

BYUtv began airing the series on their app and at byutv.org on November 8, 2021. On October 3, 2022 BYUtv began airing season 1 on television. That same day they made the second batch of 10 episodes available on their app and website.

Production concerns
The series was a topic of some controversy in the Canadian television industry after its production was announced in April 2021, when a newspaper article on the premiere of series creator Anthony Q. Farrell's contemporaneous The Parker Andersons included the statement that BYU TV series "couldn’t feature characters who are clearly identified as queer", due to the Church of Jesus Christ of Latter-day Saints' views on LGBTQ sexuality, along with those of Brigham Young University, which owns the network itself.

Within days, the network responded with a statement that "As a young network committed to bringing together religious and non-religious audiences, BYUtv is learning and exploring ways to partner with diverse content creators, writers and talent to implement meaningful co-viewing experiences for our target audience (children 8-15 and their parents). While BYUtv has not referenced LGBTQ+ topics and characters in the five original scripted series it has aired to date, we desire to address subjects – including LGBTQ+ – that are important to our growing and diverse audience. There are no policies that would exclude the network from including characters who identify as LGBTQ+, and BYUtv is exploring ways to do so," and Marblemedia confirmed that Overlord and the Underwoods will include LGBTQ characters.

References

External links

English-language television shows
CBC Gem original programming
2020s Canadian sitcoms
2021 Canadian television series debuts
Television series about families
Canadian black sitcoms
2020s Black Canadian television series
2020s Canadian comic science fiction television series